Monopeltis luandae is a species of amphisbaenian in the family Amphisbaenidae. The species is endemic to Angola.

Habitat

Description
Dorsally, it is speckled with dark pigment.

Reproduction
The mode of reproduction of M. luandae is unknown.

References

Further reading
Branch WR, Baptista N, Vaz Pinto P (2018). "Angolan Amphisbaenians: Rediscovery of Monopeltis luandae Gans 1976, with comments on the type locality of Monopeltis perplexus Gans 1976 (Sauria: Amphisbaenidae)". Herpetology Notes 11: 603–606.
Gans C (1976). "Three New Spade-Snouted Amphisbaenians from Angola (Amphisbaenia, Reptilia)". American Museum Novitates (2590): 1–11. (Monopeltis luandae, new species, pp. 3–5, Figure 2, three views, Table 1).
Gans C (2005). "Checklist and Bibliography of the Amphisbaenia of the World". Bulletin of the American Museum of Natural History (289): 1–130. (Monopeltis luandae, p. 36).

Monopeltis
Reptiles of Angola
Endemic fauna of Angola
Reptiles described in 1976
Taxa named by Carl Gans